"O" is a song by American singer Omarion. It was released on August 17, 2004, as the lead single from his debut album of the same name. "O" was the first choice for Omarion's debut single in the UK and was picked over "Touch", which was the original choice for his first UK single. The song was Omarion's first hit as a solo artist, peaking at number 27 on the US Billboard Hot 100. It also reached numbers 12 and 24 on both the Hot R&B/Hip-Hop Songs and Mainstream Top 40 charts respectively. The song also charted in New Zealand and the UK, peaking at numbers 18 and 47 respectively.

Chart performance
"O" debuted at number 68 on the Billboard Hot 100 the week of January 22, 2005. Eight weeks later, it peaked at number 27 the week of March 19, 2005 and stayed there for two weeks. It stayed on the chart for twenty weeks.

Music video
Directed by Chris Stokes (who previously directed Omarion in the 2004 film You Got Served), the video features Omarion going over to a girl's house and getting intimate with her. Intercut are scenes of Omarion dancing on the roof of an apartment with his friends, a woman or by himself. The video won the BET Award for Viewer's Choice at the BET Awards 2005.

Live performances
Omarion first performed "O" and "Touch" at the 2005 BET Awards on July 28, 2005. The performance was Military-themed with Omarion and the dancers dressed in Army outfits. He performed the song again at the 2005 American Music Awards on November 22, 2005, as part of a medley with Bow Wow's "Like You" and "Let Me Hold You".

Awards and nominations
The song was nominated for Choice Music: Make-Out Song at the 2005 Teen Choice Awards, losing to "Oh" by Ciara featuring Ludacris.

Track listing
UK - CD: 1

 "O" (album version)
 "O" (Jiggy Joint remix)

UK - CD: 2

 "O" (album version)
 "O" (Jiggy Joint remix)
 "O" (Urban clean remix) (featuring Ray Cash)
 "O" (video)
 Includes a poster

Credits and personnel
Credits are adapted from the liner notes of O.
Recording
 Recorded and mixed at The Underlab, Los Angeles

Personnel
 The Underdogs – producer
 Tank – co-producer, background vocals
 Dave "Natural Love" Russell – recording, editing, mixer
 Dabling "Hobby Boy" Harward – editing
 Kevin Mahoney – assistant engineer
 Eric Dawkins – background vocals

Charts

Weekly charts

Year-end charts

Certifications

Release history

References

2004 songs
2004 debut singles
Omarion songs
Epic Records singles
Song recordings produced by the Underdogs (production team)
Songs written by Harvey Mason Jr.
Songs written by Damon Thomas (record producer)
Songs written by Antonio Dixon (songwriter)
Songs written by Eric Dawkins